Avatier Corporation is Pleasanton, CA based software development company notable for its identity management software.

History
Avatier Corporation was founded in 1997 by Nelson Cicchitto. The corporation invented and patented the world's first Identity Access IT Store with automatic workflow. This took a different approach than traditional Identity and Access Governance Risk Management software market.

In 2006, the company developed and patented the only access management integrated ITIL-based business services catalog. This was done by fusing the catalog with an operationally efficient identity management and access governance system.

Currently, the company is based in Pleasanton, CA and has offices in 10 major cities worldwide.

References

Companies based in California